This is a list of notable soups. Soups have been made since ancient times.

Some soups are served with large chunks of meat or vegetables left in the liquid, while others are served as a broth. A broth is a flavored liquid usually derived from boiling a type of meat with bone, a spice mix, or a vegetable mix for a period of time in a stock.

A potage is a category of thick soups, stews, or porridges, in some of which meat and vegetables are boiled together with water until they form a thick mush.

Bisques are heavy cream soups traditionally prepared with shellfish, but can be made with any type of seafood or other base ingredients. Cream soups are dairy based soups. Although they may be consumed on their own, or with a meal, the canned, condensed form of cream soup is sometimes used as a quick sauce in a variety of meat and pasta convenience food dishes, such as casseroles. Similar to bisques, chowders are thick soups usually containing some type of starch.

Coulis were originally meat juices, and now are thick purées.

While soups are usually heated, some soups are served only cold and other soups can optionally be served cold.

Soups

Unsorted

 Abula
 Alu tama
 Apple soup
 Bissara
 Brenebon
 Caldo de pollo
 Caldo gallego
 Caldo de queso
 Caldo tlalpeño
 Caldo Xóchitl
 Cesnecka
 Cockchafer soup
 Coconut soup
 Edikang Ikong
 Guthuk
 Harqma
 Jusselle
 Kawlata
 Kesäkeitto
 Lime soup
 Mee ka tee
 Mole de olla
 Nsala soup
 Pea soup
 Peppersoup
 Palóc soup
 Pasulj
 Pawpaw soup
 Powsowdie
 Prawn soup
 Prdelačka
 Sciusceddu
 Sop saudara
 Sopa de fideo
 Squash soup
 Taiwanese beef noodle soup
 Tharida
 Tuo Zaafi
 Walnut soup
 Watercress soup
 Zalewajka

See also

 
 Asian soup
 Broth
 Chowder
 Consommé
 List of fish soups
 Fruit soup
 List of Azerbaijani soups and stews
 List of cheese soups
 List of Chinese soups
 List of cream soups
 List of cold soups
 List of fish and seafood soups
 List of French soups and stews
 List of German soups
 List of Indonesian soups
 List of Italian soups
 List of Japanese soups and stews
 List of Pakistani soups and stews
 List of porridges
 List of ramen dishes
 List of Spanish soups and stews
 List of vegetable soups
 Soup and sandwich
 Stew
 Stocks
 Three grand soups

References

Further reading
 
 Rumble, Victoria R (2009) Soup Through the Ages: A Culinary History With Period Recipes McFarland. .

External links
 

 
Soups